Nevolin is a Russian masculine surname; its feminine counterpart is Nevolina. It may refer to
Alexander Nevolin-Svetov (born 1988), Russian Paralympic swimmer 
Konstantin Nevolin (1806–1855), Russian legal historian

Russian-language surnames